Louise Hansen (born 4 May 1975) is a Danish retired football player. She is considered the most successful Danish woman footballer ever.

She played for Hillerød GI and Rødovre BK in Denmark. In 1995, she started playing for German club TSV Siegen, transferring to rival team 1. FFC Frankfurt in the summer 2001. With Frankfurt she won six German Bundesliga championships, four German Cup trophies, and three UEFA Women's Cups. She ended her footballing career in the summer 2008 after increasing injury problems, in order to concentrate on a career in marketing.

She played 98 games for the Denmark national team from February 1995 to August 2007, and participated in the 1995 and 1999 FIFA World Cups and the 1997 and 2005 UEFA European Championships.

Since the 2006 World Cup, she has led and managed "Girls Wanted", an initiative aimed at attracting girls to football, in cooperation with 1. FFC Frankfurt and the Frankfurt Stadtwerke Verkehrsgesellschaft.

Honours
German Bundesliga: 2001, 2002, 2003, 2005, 2008
German Cup: 2001, 2002, 2003, 2008
UEFA Women's Cup: 2002, 2006, 2008

References

External links
 

1975 births
Living people
People from Hørsholm Municipality
Danish women's footballers
Footballers at the 1996 Summer Olympics
Olympic footballers of Denmark
Danish expatriate women's footballers
Denmark women's international footballers
1995 FIFA Women's World Cup players
1. FFC Frankfurt players
Expatriate women's footballers in Germany
Danish expatriate sportspeople in Germany
Women's association football midfielders
German footballers needing infoboxes
2007 FIFA Women's World Cup players
1999 FIFA Women's World Cup players
Sportspeople from the Capital Region of Denmark